Fibrinogen-like protein 1 (FGL-1) is a protein that is structurally related to fibrinogen. In humans, FGL-1 is encoded by the FGL1 gene. Four splice variants exist for this gene.

Function 

Fibrinogen-like protein 1 is a member of the fibrinogen family of proteins, which also includes fibrinogen, fibrinogen-like protein 2, and clotting factors V, VIII, and XIII. FGL-1 is homologous to the carboxy terminus of the fibrinogen beta- and gamma- subunits which contains the four conserved cysteines of that are common to all members of the fibrinogen family. However, FGL-1 lacks the platelet-binding site, cross-linking region, and thrombin-sensitive site which allow the other members of the fibrinogen family to aid in fibrin clot formation.

FGL-1 has also been observed to strongly bind to and activate LAG-3, a regulatory protein expressed on T cells. As LAG-3 has an important role in controlling activated T cells, manipulating FGL-1 binding to T cells has been proposed for both cancer immunotherapy and anti-inflammatory treatments.

Clinical significance 

FGL-1 may play a role in the development of hepatocellular carcinomas.

References

Further reading